Belem is a three-masted barque from France.

She made her maiden voyage as a cargo ship in 1896, transporting sugar from the West Indies, cocoa, and coffee from Brazil and French Guiana to Nantes, France.

History 
Belem escaped the eruption of Mount Pelée in Saint-Pierre, Martinique, on 8 May 1902.  On arriving at Saint Pierre ahead of the eruption, Captain Julien Chauvelon found that roadsteads were full of vessels. With no place to anchor the ship Chauvelon angrily decided to anchor some miles further away off a beach, which provided shelter when the volcano erupted.

She was sold in 1914 to Hugh Grosvenor, 2nd Duke of Westminster, who converted her to his private luxurious pleasure yacht, complete with two auxiliary Bolinder Diesel engines of 300 HP each.

In 1922 she became the property of Sir Ernest Guinness, of the Guinness family, who renamed her the Fantôme II and revised the rig from a square rigger. Guinness was Rear Commodore of the Royal St. George Yacht Club, in Kingstown, Ireland, from 1921 to 1939. He was Vice Commodore from 1940 to 1948. Hon. A.E. Guinness took the Fântome II on a great cruise in 1923 with his daughters Aileen, Maureen, and Oonagh. They sailed the seven seas in making a travel round the world via the Panama and Suez Canals including a visit to Spitsbergen. During her approach to Yokohama harbour while sailing the Pacific Ocean the barque managed to escape another catastrophe - an earthquake which destroyed the harbour and parts of Yokohama city.  Guinness died in 1949. The Fântome II was moored in the roads of Cowes, Isle of Wight.
 
In 1951 she was sold to the Venezian count Vittorio Cini, who named her the Giorgio Cini after his son, who had died in a plane crash near Cannes on 31 August 1949 . She was rigged to a barkentine and used as a sail training ship until 1965, when she was considered too old for further use and was moored at the Island of San Giorgio Maggiore, Venice.

In 1972 the Italian carabinieri attempted to restore her to the original barque rig. When this proved too expensive, she became the property of the shipyard. In 1976 the ship was re-rigged to a barque.

Finally, in January 1979, she came back to her home port as the Belem under tow by a French seagoing tug, flying the French flag after 65 years. Fully restored to her original condition, she began a new career as a sail training ship.

Current specifications of the Belem 

406 tons and 51 m of length
Riveted steel keel (for older parts)
Iron sheet: 11 mm
Ballast in hull: 4,500 pig irons of 50 kg each
Hull length without bowsprit: 51 m
Bowsprit length: 7 m
Extreme length: 58 m
Waterline length: 48 m
Midship width: 8.80 m
Moulded depth: 4.60 m
Draught: 3.60 m
B.R.T.: 534 tons
Displacement: 750 tons

Masting - rigging
Steel masts in 2 parts (lower mast, topmast)
Main mast height above waterline level: 34 m
Lower yards in steel, top gallant and royal yards in wood
About 220 points of running-rigging
About 250 simple-blocks, double-blocks and triple-blocks
4500 m of running-rigging in polyamide rope

Sails
Number of sails: 22
Sail area: 1000,5 m² (all above, without storm sail)

Propulsion and equipment
Driven by 2 diesel motors: John Deere 6135AFM, 575 HP each (installed February 2013)
2 propeller shafts, 2 four-blade propellers
3 generators
Diesel storage: 40 tons
Cruising range: 24 days at 7 knots, about 4 000 nautical miles (7400 km)
Fresh water storage: 20 tons
Production of about 3 tons of water per day via dialyzer
Electric windlass
3 hydraulic capstans (two small on the bridge, one of each side, used to hoist upper yards, but never used during traineeships, one large on the poop, in front of the mizzen mast, used to heave tight hawsers during mooring operations)

Performance
Maximum speed with engine on flat calm sea: 8 to 9 knots
Maximum speed with sails: 11 to 12 knots
75° abeam wind capability
Duration to set all sails by good weather conditions: 30 to 40 mn
Duration to heave tight all sails by good weather conditions: 50 to 60 mn
Duration of a complete tacking: 15 to 20 mn depending on wind conditions

Crewmen
16 men: 1 captain, 1 chief officer, 2 lieutenants, 1 chief engineer, 2 cooks, 1 boatswain, 1 carpenter, 7 yardmen (two from the French National Service until 2000)
Personal management by la Société Nantaise de Navigation
Maximum number of trainees: 48 (two watches of 24, divided in third of 16)

See also
Fantome

References

External links
Fondation Belem
Le trois-mâts barque Belem
RC Belem Model Ship
Eco-friendly French to ship their wine under sail

Barques
Individual sailing vessels
Tall ships of France
Ships built in France
Three-masted ships
1896 ships
Ships built by Chantiers Dubigeon